Veduggio con Colzano (Milanese: Vedugg) is a comune (municipality) in the Province of Monza and Brianza in the Italian region Lombardy, located about  north of Milan.

References

External links 
 www.comune.veduggioconcolzano.mb.it/